List of episodes for the 2000 Plus radio show.

1950

1951

Notes
 Some sites offering CDs also include episodes of the series 2000X, which was produced in 2000 and is not part of the original series run.

Footnotes

External links
 OTR Plot Spot: 2000 Plus - plot summaries and reviews.
Jerry Haendiges Vintage Radio Logs: Two Thousand Plus
Fifteen episodes of 2000 Plus in the Internet Archive’s “Old Time Radio” collection

2000 Plus